Plumtree is a former settlement in Yolo County, California. It still appeared on maps as of 1916.

References

External links

Former settlements in Yolo County, California
Former populated places in California